Heather Kay Wheeler (née Wilkinson; born 14 May 1959) is a British Conservative Party politician, who was first elected at the 2010 general election as the member of Parliament (MP) for South Derbyshire, taking the seat from the Labour Party after 13 years.

Early life and local government career
Wheeler was born in Norwich, Norfolk on 14 May 1959. She was brought up in Wandsworth, London. She was educated at Grey Coat Hospital, an all-girls state school in Westminster, London.

She was elected a Conservative member for West Hill ward on Wandsworth London Borough Council at the age of 23 in 1982. After serving a full council term, she married Robert Wheeler, moving in 1986 to Bretby, South Derbyshire.

After working for Lloyd's insurance brokers for 10 years, qualifying by exam as an Associate, she became a member of the Chartered Insurance Institute.

Wheeler was first elected to South Derbyshire District Council in 1995 for the safe Conservative seat of Repton. She went on to become leader of the council's Conservative group and became Leader of the Council between 2007 and 2010. She was successfully re-elected as a councillor for Repton ward until 2011; her daughter Harriet unsuccessfully stood as a Conservative candidate in Swadlincote ward in 2011, whilst husband Bob successfully defended his marginal Linton ward and continued as Leader of the council.

Parliamentary career
Wheeler stood unsuccessfully at the 2001 and 2005 general elections as her party's candidate for Coventry South. Wheeler was a member of the Conservative Party's A-List prior to being selected to contest the South Derbyshire constituency. At the 2010 general election, she gained the seat from Labour with a majority of 7,128; there was a 9.8% swing to the Conservatives. Following her election as a Member of Parliament she stood aside as Conservative council group leader. She was re-elected in 2015 and 2017, with the former defying polling that suggested her seat would be vulnerable following the Conservative Government's failure to award a major contract to local train manufacturer Bombardier.

In the House of Commons she sat on the Standards and Privileges Committee, the European Scrutiny Committee and the Communities and Local Government Committee. She was also a member of the Public Bill Committee for the Defence Reform Act 2014.

Wheeler was one of 79 Conservative MPs who supported a 2011 rebel motion calling for a referendum on the European Union. She also joined a 2013 rebel amendment expressing regret at not including the referendum in the government's plans. She subsequently backed the government's plans to hold a referendum in 2017 and opposed a proposal to hold it in 2014. Wheeler backed Leave in the referendum.

On 9 January 2018, Wheeler was appointed Parliamentary Under-Secretary of State at the Ministry of Housing, Communities and Local Government, with responsibility for homelessness and rough sleeping as well as the private rented and leasehold sectors, in the second May ministry.

In March 2018, following her promotion to a Government position with responsibility for homelessness, Wheeler told The Guardian newspaper that she did not know why the number of rough sleepers had increased in recent years. Wheeler rejected the suggestion that welfare reforms and council cuts relating to her Government had contributed to the rise. Earlier in the same month, Wheeler promised to resign if the number of people rough sleeping got worse while she was in office.

On 26 July 2019, Wheeler was appointed as the Parliamentary under-secretary of state for Asia and the Pacific at the Foreign and Commonwealth Office in the first Johnson ministry. She resigned for family reasons in February 2020.

In 2021, she unsuccessfully ran for election to become chair of the 1922 Committee.

On 17 September 2021, Wheeler was appointed an assistant Government whip in the second cabinet reshuffle of the second Johnson ministry.

Controversies

In August 2016, following the 2016 Rio Olympics, the European Union social media account shared a modified medals table showing its combined member states in first place. Wheeler tweeted in response that the British Empire had won the 2016 Rio Olympics along with a map of former imperial territories. Her comments were described by Labour MP David Lammy as "deeply offensive to so many people and their ancestors". Wheeler rejected calls to apologise, stating that her comments were "tongue-in-cheek".

In June 2019, it was revealed that in October 2017, three months before she became minister, Wheeler described rough sleepers in her constituency as "the traditional type, old tinkers, knife-cutters wandering through". In response, Wheeler faced calls to resign from Stephen Robertson, the chief executive of the Big Issue Foundation and a representative from a leading national charity which works on behalf of Gypsies, Travellers and Roma described the language as "disgraceful". Wheeler issued an apology for her "inappropriate language", and said it "is not at all representative of the great cultural contribution and rich heritage that the Gypsy, Roma and Traveller communities make to this country".

In June 2022, Wheeler was criticised by Labour for comments made at a lunch in London, in which she described Birmingham and Blackpool as "godawful" places. Wheeler later apologised and said she made an "inappropriate remark that does not reflect my actual view".

Personal life
Wheeler's late husband Bob was a Conservative councillor who was made leader of South Derbyshire District Council in 2010, after his wife stepped down from the role on becoming an MP. He stood down as Leader of the Council in January 2018; he died in late 2018.

References

External links

Official website

 

1959 births
Living people
Conservative Party (UK) MPs for English constituencies
Councillors in the London Borough of Wandsworth
Councillors in Derbyshire
Members of the Parliament of the United Kingdom for constituencies in Derbyshire
Female members of the Parliament of the United Kingdom for English constituencies
People educated at Grey Coat Hospital
UK MPs 2010–2015
UK MPs 2015–2017
UK MPs 2017–2019
UK MPs 2019–present
21st-century British women politicians
21st-century English women
21st-century English people
Women councillors in England